"Tommy the Cat" is a song by the American funk metal band Primus, released on their second album, Sailing the Seas of Cheese.

Recording
The song contains spoken word portions (as the voice of Tommy the Cat) interspersed with the singing of Les Claypool. In their live performances Claypool does both parts himself, but singer Tom Waits provided the voice of Tommy the Cat on the studio version from Sailing the Seas of Cheese.

Release
Primus released "Tommy the Cat" following their first major label single, "Jerry Was a Race Car Driver". In concert, Claypool started introducing all of their other songs by saying "This next song is not Tommy the Cat", apparently due to the popularity the song had gained after a video was released and played on MTV.

The song was briefly featured in the 1991 film Bill & Ted's Bogus Journey during the "Battle of the Bands" portion of the movie, where Primus was shown performing it.

The song was also used in the teaser trailers for South Park: Bigger, Longer, and Uncut.

A version called "Butters the Cat" was performed by Primus and Matt Stone at the South Park: 25th Anniversary Concert.

Music video
A black-and-white music video was made featuring live action and animation. Les Claypool is seen as a bartender pouring milk for an elderly man dressed as a cat and a smiling figure. The animation featured a female cat strolling into an alley filled with numerous tomcats while the titular Tommy relays what happened. Interspersed are occasional footage of the band playing the song.

References

Songs about cats
Experimental rock songs
Primus (band) songs
1991 singles
1991 songs
Songs written by Les Claypool
Songs written by Larry LaLonde
Songs written by Tim Alexander
Interscope Records singles